
Gmina Drawsko is a rural gmina (administrative district) in Czarnków-Trzcianka County, Greater Poland Voivodeship, in west-central Poland.

Villages
Gmina Drawsko contains the villages and settlements of Chełst, Drawski Młyn, Drawsko, Kamiennik, Kawczyn, Kwiejce, Marylin, Moczydła, Nowe Kwiejce, Pęckowo, Pełcza and Piłka.

Neighbouring gminas
Gmina Drawsko is bordered by the gminas of Drezdenko, Krzyż Wielkopolski, Sieraków, Wieleń and Wronki.

References
 Polish official population figures 2006

Drawsko
Czarnków-Trzcianka County